Stefan Edberg was the defending champion, but lost in the final to Andre Agassi. The score in the final was 6–4, 2–6, 7–5.

Seeds
The first eight seeds received a bye to the second round.

Draw

Finals

Top half

Section 1

Section 2

Bottom half

Section 3

Section 4

References

External links
 Official results archive (ATP)
 Official results archive (ITF)

1995 ATP Tour